Benezet's School, also known as the African Free School and the Raspberry Street School, was a Philadelphia school for African Americans.

History
This school was founded by Quaker teacher and abolitionist, Anthony Benezet, in 1770. Classes were held in a number of locations before a dedicated school building opened in 1773. Between 1773 and 1779, the school educated two hundred and fifty children, accepting both free and enslaved children in order to ensure that classrooms were filled.

The school was known as both Benezet's School in honor of its founder and Raspberry Street School due to its location.

Notable alumni 
 Absalom Jones
 Richard Allen
 James Forten

References 

Schools in Philadelphia
Quakers
History of Philadelphia
History of education